Stange Sound is a sound about 60 nautical miles (110 km) long and 25 nautical miles (46 km) wide along the coast of Palmer Land. An ice shelf occupies the sound, which is bounded on the west by Smyley and Case Islands, on the south by the mainland, on the east by Spaatz Island and on the north by open water in Ronne Entrance. Photographed from the air and roughly plotted by the Ronne Antarctic Research Expedition (RARE) (1947–48) under Finn Ronne. Named for Henry Stange of New York City, a contributor to RARE who gave much time to assisting in preparations for the expedition.

Sounds of Antarctica
Bodies of water of Palmer Land